The Bickersons was a radio comedy sketch series that began September 8, 1946, on NBC, moving the following year to CBS where it continued until August 28, 1951. The show's married protagonists, portrayed by Don Ameche (later by Lew Parker) and Frances Langford, spent nearly all their time together in relentless verbal war.

Origins
The Bickersons was created by Philip Rapp, the one-time Eddie Cantor writer who had also created the Fanny Brice skits (for The Ziegfeld Follies of the Air and Maxwell House Coffee Time) that grew into radio's Baby Snooks. Several years after the latter established itself a long-running favorite, Rapp developed and presented John and Blanche Bickerson, first as a short sketch on The Old Gold Show and The Chase and Sanborn Hour (the show that made stars of Edgar Bergen and his dummy, Charlie McCarthy), and then as a 15-minute situational sketch as part of Drene Time. This was a variety show starring Don Ameche and singer-actress Frances Langford as co-hosts, airing on NBC and sponsored by Drene Shampoo. Announcing the show—and later familiar to television viewers as The Millionaires presenter and executive secretary, Michael Anthony—was Marvin Miller.

Drene Time typically opened with Langford singing a big band-style arrangement before Ameche and Langford would slip into routine comedy, often aided by co-star Danny Thomas, in routines that often expressed Ameche's frustration that Thomas was more interested in modern technology and discoveries than in women. After another musical number and a commercial spot for Drene Shampoo, Miller would announce Ameche and Langford as the Bickersons, "in 'The Honeymoon's Over', for the final 15 minutes of the show.

Feud for thought
The typical Miller introduction would set the scene:

The Bickersons... have retired. Three o'clock in the morning finds Mrs. Bickerson wide awake and anxious, as poor husband John, victim of contagious insomnia, or Schmoe's Disease, broadcasts the telltale signs of the dreaded affliction. Listen...

The listener heard a chorus of low-roaring snoring, punctuated occasionally with something that sounded like laughing mixed with crying. Blanche would awaken John, even at three in the morning, and the feuding would continue with their trademark arguments about John's jobs, Blanche's domestic abilities, Blanche's continual wasteful spending of his money; John's alleged eye for neighbor Gloria Gooseby, Blanche's shiftless brother Amos (played by Thomas, whose real given name was Amos), her other family members (notably her sister, Clara) or John's taste for bourbon.

Sometimes, they would go off on random rants about various scenarios. Blanche usually moaning about not having children, and, after unloading on him about how miserable life would be for a child in that house, would accuse John of not feeding their non-existent baby (after calling him an unsympathetic unfeeling wretch), or John ranting about Blanche marrying someone else (usually their tightwad physician, Dr. Hersey) and him living off of his money, usually after John was taunted into making out a will.

During their spats, Blanche would often try to force John to do something that normally wouldn't be done at such an early morning hour, such as the aforementioned will; going to Dr. Hersey's office to cure his snoring; or getting re-married. She usually taunted him into these actions, by saying, "You'll say it, but you won't do it. Do it now!"

In fairness, John once turned the tables on Blanche by trying to provoke her (using the "you'll say it, but you won't do it!" spiel) into buying him a race-horse after she took his money and squandered it on a bookie.

Rounding out the cast was future children's television favorite Pinky Lee in occasional supporting roles.

As New York Herald Tribune critic John Crosby described them (in the May 25, 1948 column which gave the couple their nickname, "The Bickering [Battling? See Talk] Bickersons"):

Blanche... is one of the monstrous shrews of all time. She makes her husband... take two jobs, a total of 16 working hours, in order to bring in more money which she squanders on minks and the stock market. Meanwhile, he can't afford a new pair of shoes and goes around with his feet painted black. In the few hours he has to sleep, she heckles him all night with the accusation that he doesn't love her. Her aim appears to be to drive her husband crazy and she succeeds very nicely. The harassed John's only weapon is insult, at which he's pretty good.

Dialogue
As transcribed by John Crosby, this was a typical Bickersons exchange:

B: You used to be so considerate. Since you got married to me you haven't got any sympathy at all.
J: I have, too. I've got everybody's sympathy.
B: Believe me, there's better fish in the ocean than the one I caught.
J: There's better bait, too.
B: I don't see how you can go to bed without kissing me good night.
J: I can do it.
B: You'd better say you're sorry for that, John.
J: Okay, I'm sorry, I'm sorry, I'm sorry.
B: You are not.
J: I am too. I'm the sorriest man that was ever born.
B: Is there any milk for breakfast?
J: No.
B: Then you'll have to eat out.
J: I don't care, I've been doing it all week.
B: What for? I left you enough food for six days. I cooked a whole bathtub full of rice. What happened to it?
J: I took a bath in it.
B: Why didn't you eat it?
J: I've told you a million times I can't stand the sight of rice.
B: Why not?
J: Because it's connected to the saddest mistake of my life.
B: You stopped loving me the day we were married.
J: That wasn't the day at all.

The flip side
Though they spent their allotted time together at each other's throats, assuming always that the shrewish Blanche could awaken John from his snoring, there were moments when the couple showed an uncommon tenderness to each other—particularly in a Christmas skit. (It should have been hinted at the outset by Marvin Miller's atypical introduction: "The Bickersons—have not retired.") After arguing over whether John had sent Blanche a Christmas card (he had, it was buried in a stack of newspapers), they exchanged their gifts to each other... with a twist. Tight in the pocketbook, Blanche had swapped a fur coat to buy her bourbon-loving husband a portable bar; John—although a bourbon lover—had swapped his stock to buy Blanche a matching fur muffler. But the skit ends with the confession that, for all that they're each other's biggest pain in the rump, there really is a love between them.

Jackie Gleason probably knew of that Christmas exchange or had also read the short story it was based on, O. Henry's "The Gift of the Magi." A "classic 39" Christmas episode of The Honeymooners involved blustery bus driver Ralph hocking his brand-new bowling ball in a mad dash to get Alice a last-minute Christmas gift, only to learn the hard way that Alice had bought him a stylish new bowling ball bag.

Television
The Bickersons had at least three television runs. The first was as a segment on Star Time, which ran on Dumont for a half-season, from September 1950 to February 1951. A stand-alone Bickersons series ran on CBS for a short time in summer 1951. In both versions, Lew Parker (later familiar as That Girls harried, slightly overbearing father Lew Marie) took the role of John Bickerson, as he also had done on radio a season earlier. The televised version did not work as well as the original skits. Langford did not appear to have the seamless anti-chemistry with Parker as she did with Ameche, and the show's persistent setting (always in the same bedroom) made the show less than ideal for the visual medium. Premiering as a summer season replacement, the CBS version of The Bickersons lasted only 13 episodes.

Ameche and Langford later co-hosted a variety series, The Frances Langford–Don Ameche Show, in 1951–1952, and featured among the few regular performers a very young Jack Lemmon, as a newlywed in a sketch series known as "The Couple Next Door". When Langford hosted a variety special in 1960, Ameche appeared along with The Three Stooges (Moe Howard, Larry Fine, and Joe DeRita at the time), Bob Cummings and Johnny Mathis.

Recordings
But neither did the twosome abandon the characters that made them famous as a comedy team in the first place: Columbia Records eventually released long-playing albums—The Bickersons, The Bickersons Fight Back, and The Bickersons Rematch—that featured newly recorded performances of Rapp's adapted radio scripts by Ameche and Langford as John and Blanche. 'Rematch' was the two LPs reissued in a gatefold jacket as a two record set.

A beautiful woman with a honey voice who used sheer talent to turn herself into the venomous Blanche Bickerson, Frances Langford enjoyed a fine career as a singer and actress in film (including a memorable cameo in the otherwise stylised The Glenn Miller Story) and television, as well as radio; she died July 11, 2005. Don Ameche, whose name sometimes became synonymous (and a kind of running gag) with the telephone (thanks to his film portrayal of Alexander Graham Bell), became a familiar television face as well as a well-respected film actor, enjoying a late-life popular revival through his roles in the 1983 film Trading Places and the 1985 film Cocoon. He died in 1993.

Adaptations and cultural references
With the Rapp family approval, an adapted version of The Bickersons was written for a comedy puppet show, Breakfast with the Bickersons, premiering at the 2007 Edinburgh Festival Fringe. The show was adapted and directed by British comedian Jeremy Engler.

Satsuma & Pumpkin starred Bob Monkhouse OBE, and was also his very last work before he died. Monkhouse was a big fan of The Bickersons and The Baby Snooks Show.

In the movie MASH, when Radar O'Reilly bugs Margaret Houlihan's tent as she and Frank Burns have a sexual encounter, Father Mulcahy (who has walked into the room while the others are listening) is told that the conversation (and noises) being listened to are a radio program. He asks if it is an episode of The Bickersons...until he realizes otherwise, and hastily leaves.

In the Season 1 finale of NewsRadio, Dave and Lisa are called "the magnificent Bickersons" by Bill (at once a reference to the radio show and a play on the title of Orson Welles' 1942 film The Magnificent Ambersons). Ameche and Welles shared the same hometown of Kenosha, Wisconsin, and at 8:00 p.m. Eastern Time on the night of October 30, 1938, Welles made his legendary "War of the Worlds radio broadcast on the CBS network while Ameche hosted The Chase and Sanborn Hour on the Red Network of NBC.

The Bickersons can be heard in the video game L.A. Noire, playing on the radio during driving sequences.

The Bickersons inspired The Honeymooners and other television shows about couples.

In episode 11 of season 6 of "Better Call Saul", Saul Goodman says to Walter White and Jesse Pinkman "Fellas, I was enjoying the Laurel & Hardy vibe, but I'm not such a fan of The Bickersons!" in response to White and Pinkman arguing with each other.

Notes

References
 Frank Buxton and Bill Owen, The Big Broadcast 1920–1950 (New York: Flare/Avon Books, 1971) 
 John Crosby, Out of the Blue: A Book About Radio and Television (New York: Simon and Schuster, 1952) 
 Gerald Nachman, Raised on Radio (New York: Pantheon Books, 1998) 
 Ben Ohmart, The Bickersons (BearManor Media, 2007), 
 Philip Rapp, The Bickersons Scripts (BearManor Media, 2002), 
 Philip Rapp, The Bickersons Scripts Vol. 2 (BearManor Media, 2004),

External links
 The Bickersons official site
 Jerry Haendiges Vintage Radio Logs: The Bickersons
 
 List of recordings on discogs.com as by Ameche and Langford

 Audio
 OTR Network Library: The Bickersons (47 episodes)
 Botar.us Collection: The Bickersons (32 episodes) 

Radio programs about families
1940s American radio programs
1950s American radio programs
1946 radio programme debuts
1951 radio programme endings
American comedy radio programs
NBC radio programs
CBS Radio programs